
The following is a list of Historic Civil Engineering Landmarks as designated by the American Society of Civil Engineers since it began the program in 1964. The designation is granted to projects, structures, and sites in the United States (National Historic Civil Engineering Landmarks) and the rest of the world (International Historic Civil Engineering Landmarks). As of 2019, there are over 280 landmarks that have been approved by the ASCE Board of Direction.
Sections or chapters of the American Society of Civil Engineers may also designate state or local landmarks within their areas; those landmarks are not listed here.

See also 
 List of Historic Mechanical Engineering Landmarks

References

External links
 American Society of Civil Engineers Historic Landmarks
 

Civil engineering
American Society of Civil Engineers
Civil engineering